Wandering Through Winter: A Naturalist's Record of a 20,000-Mile Journey Through the North American Winter is a non-fiction book written by Edwin Way Teale, published in 1965 by Dodd, Mead and Company, and winner of the 1966 Pulitzer Prize for General Non-Fiction. The book was republished in 1990 by St Martin's Press.
 
This book documents the travels of a naturalist and his wife, Nellie I. Teale who spent four winter months traveling twenty thousand miles across the southwestern United States and parts of the Midwest. The trip ended in northeastern Maine. The book includes reports on the people, plants, animals, and birds they encountered. It is the final volume in his natural history of the four seasons in North America; a 76,000 miles journey over 15 years, which began with North with the Spring, Journey Into Summer, and Autumn Across America.

References

External links

1965 non-fiction books
American travel books
Pulitzer Prize for General Non-Fiction-winning works
Dodd, Mead & Co. books